Ray is a city in Williams County, North Dakota, United States. The population was 740 at the 2020 census.

History

Ray was founded in 1902. The city was named in honor of Al G. Ray, a railroad official. A post office has been in operation at Ray since 1902.

Geography
Ray is located at  (48.344875, -103.166292).

Demographics

2010 census
As of the census of 2010, there were 592 people, 276 households, and 163 families residing in the city. The racial makeup of the city was 95.9% White, 2.5% Native American, 0.3% Asian, and 1.2% from two or more races. Hispanic or Latino of any race were 1.0% of the population.

There were 276 households, of which 22.1% had children under the age of 18 living with them, 51.8% were married couples living together, 4.3% had a female householder with no husband present, 2.9% had a male householder with no wife present, and 40.9% were non-families. 35.5% of all households were made up of individuals, and 14.4% had someone living alone who was 65 years of age or older. The average household size was 2.14 and the average family size was 2.78.

The median age in the city was 46.1 years. 20.8% of residents were under the age of 18; 7.5% were between the ages of 18 and 24; 20.3% were from 25 to 44; 35% were from 45 to 64; and 16.4% were 65 years of age or older. The gender makeup of the city was 53.2% male and 46.8% female.

2000 census
As of the census of 2000, there were 534 people, 232 households, and 154 families residing in the city. The population density was 531.5 people per square mile (206.2/km). There were 296 housing units at an average density of 294.6 per square mile (114.3/km). The racial makeup of the city was 99.06% White, 0.56% Native American, and 0.37% from two or more races. Hispanic or Latino of any race were 0.56% of the population.

There were 232 households, out of which 27.6% had children under the age of 18 living with them, 59.9% were married couples living together, 4.3% had a female householder with no husband present, and 33.6% were non-families. 32.3% of all households were made up of individuals, and 18.1% had someone living alone who was 65 years of age or older. The average household size was 2.30 and the average family size was 2.90.

In the city, the population was spread out, with 23.8% under the age of 18, 4.9% from 18 to 24, 21.9% from 25 to 44, 29.0% from 45 to 64, and 20.4% who were 65 years of age or older. The median age was 45 years. For every 100 females, there were 101.5 males. For every 100 females age 18 and over, there were 101.5 males.

The median income for a household in the city was $31,563, and the median income for a family was $41,771. Males had a median income of $34,063 versus $18,125 for females. The per capita income for the city was $16,064. About 2.6% of families and 3.7% of the population were below the poverty line, including none of those under age 18 and 6.3% of those age 65 or over.

Education
It is within the Nesson School District (Ray Public School).

Notable people

 Delbert F. Anderson, farmer and member of the Minnesota House of Representatives, was born in Ray.
 Mary Sherman Morgan, inventor of Hydyne, which was combined with liquid oxygen to propel the first US rocket into orbit (1958), was born in Ray.
 Claudia Meier Volk, member of the Minnesota House of Representatives, lived in Ray.

References

Cities in Williams County, North Dakota
Cities in North Dakota
Populated places established in 1902
1902 establishments in North Dakota